Canada Water is a London Underground and London Overground station located in Canada Water, in south London, England. It takes its name from Canada Water, a lake which was created from a former dock in the Port of London.

It is in Travelcard Zone 2.

London Overground services commenced on the East London line on 27 April 2010, as the replacement extension of the historic tube line.

History
Canada Water was originally intended to be a stop on the aborted Fleet line Extension to Thamesmead. The extension was never built, but Canada Water became the only projected Fleet line Extension station to be realised on the Jubilee Line Extension.

The station is a wholly new building on a derelict site formerly occupied by Albion Dock, part of the old Surrey Commercial Docks. The station was one of the first designed for the Jubilee line Extension. The contract for the station's construction was initially awarded to Wimpey in 1993 for the sum of £21.3 million and was later taken over by Tarmac. Construction began in 1995. Construction was complicated by the high water table on the site, which is located on the Thames flood plain; extensive deep-well dewatering was required to lower the water table before the enclosure to the excavations could be built. A total of 120,000 m³ (4,237,760 ft³) of spoil had to be excavated. An additional complication was the location of the excavation site, near the foundations of two existing 22-storey tower blocks and the northern end of the former Canada Dock, now the ornamental lake Canada Water. The section of East London line running through the station was completely reconstructed, with the 19th-century brick railway tunnel being dismantled and the track relaid over a new structure bridging the Jubilee line tracks below. As the East London line had to be closed for this work, London Underground took the opportunity to carry out other remedial works such as repairs to the Thames Tunnel, a short distance to the north.

It was opened on 19 August 1999, served initially by East London line trains. The Jubilee line passenger service from the station began on 17 September that year.

In 2012, it was used as a filming location for part of the pilot episode of the BBC/Cinemax British-American spy drama, Hunted (TV series).

Canada Water was the first station to receive external sponsorship; Nestlé sponsored the station on the day of the 2015 London Marathon, and roundels in the station were edited to advertise Nestlé's Buxton Water. The one-day sponsorship was part of a plan to increase Transport for London's non-fare revenue, costing Nestlé £110,000.

Architecture

The station, which was the first to be designed in the Jubilee line Extension project, has been described by the Hong Kong MTR's chief architect Roland Paoletti as "the only station on the JLE that has been built to the strict engineering economies of the specification of a Hong Kong interchange station." This feature was designed to allow natural light to reach deep into the station, a design principle common to many of the stations on the Jubilee line Extension. The drum was designed and constructed by Buro Happold. It is notably similar to the brick drum designed by Charles Holden for  station on the Piccadilly line in the 1930s, but is much more oriented towards the entry of daylight.

The drum is accompanied by a glass-roofed bus station designed by Eva Jiřičná which serves as a hub for services in the Rotherhithe and Bermondsey areas. The bus station was designed to fit in a relatively small site between the station drum, the railway's ventilation openings, a high wall and the adjoining tower blocks. Its most distinctive feature is a row of -long roof spans cantilevered from a row of central columns supporting a -long glass and aluminium canopy. This provides acoustic protection to the residential blocks and shelters passengers waiting below.

Below ground, the station is dominated by a huge concrete box, large enough to accommodate one of the Canary Wharf skyscrapers on its side. It is lined by a series of huge concrete pillars designed to take the weight of a planned nine-storey building on the surface as well as the roadway and bus station.

The station was the winner of the Civic Trust Building of the Year Award for 2000, and the Interchange Awards' Medium Size Project of the Year award for 2001.

Connections
London Buses routes 1, 47, 188, 199, 225, 381, C10, P12 and night routes N199 and N381 serve the station and bus station.

Services
Canada Water is the busiest two-platform National Rail station, with 25 million entries and exits to the NR platforms in 2017–18.

References

External links

 Eva Jiricna Architects - Canada Water Bus Station

Jubilee line stations
London Underground Night Tube stations
London Overground Night Overground stations
Tube stations in the London Borough of Southwark
Railway stations in the London Borough of Southwark
Transport architecture in London
Railway stations served by London Overground
Railway stations in Great Britain opened in 1999